Lanier High School (LHS) is a public high school in Sugar Hill, Georgia, United States, and is a part of Gwinnett County Public Schools. It opened for classes on August 9, 2010.

The Lanier school district is made up of Sycamore Elementary School, White Oak Elementary School, Sugar Hill Elementary School, Lanier Middle School, and Lanier High School.

The athletic rivals of the LHS Longhorns are the Bulldogs of North Gwinnett High School.

Lanier High School was football regional champion in the 2014–2015 school year. Other sports recognitions they have received are 1st place in competition cheer (2014-2015), 2nd place Marching Band (2013-2014), 3rd place Marching Band (2014-2015), 1st place Drumline (2013-2015), 1st place Drum Major (2013-2015) 3rd place Color Guard (2013-2014), 2nd place Color Guard (2014-2015), One Act theater regional champions (2015-2016) and boys' soccer Region 8-AAAAA Champions (2015-2016).

History

In 1915, Sugar Hill High School was opened,  later in 1958, North Gwinnett High School was established. The Sugar Hill School served grades one through seven. Then in 2010 Lanier High School was established as a split of the North Gwinnett High School cluster. This brought a high school back to Sugar Hill.

Notable alumni
Derrick Brown, NFL football defensive tackle
Zack Calzada, college football Quarterback

References

Educational institutions established in 2010
Schools in Gwinnett County, Georgia
Public high schools in Georgia (U.S. state)
2010 establishments in Georgia (U.S. state)